Cycloteuthis sirventi is a species of squid in the family Cycloteuthidae, of which it is the most common. It is possible that C. akimushkini is a junior synonym of C. sirventi. The species occurs in the tropical to polar western Atlantic Ocean.

References

External links
Tree of Life web project: Cycloteuthis sirventyi
SeaLifeBase: Cycloteuthis sirventi

Squid
Molluscs described in 1919